The 17th Guldbagge Awards ceremony, presented by the Swedish Film Institute, honored the best Swedish films of 1980 and 1981 and took place on 30 October 1981. Children's Island directed by Kay Pollak was presented with the award for Best Film.

Awards
 Best Film: Children's Island by Kay Pollak
 Best Director: Kay Pollak for Children's Island
 Best Actor: Ingvar Hirdwall for Children's Island
 Best Actress: Gunn Wållgren for Sally and Freedom
 The Ingmar Bergman Award: Lasse Åberg

References

External links
Official website
Guldbaggen on Facebook
Guldbaggen on Twitter
17th Guldbagge Awards at Internet Movie Database

1981 in Sweden
1981 film awards
Guldbagge Awards ceremonies
October 1981 events in Europe
1980s in Stockholm